Plasmodium achiotense is a parasite of the genus Plasmodium subgenus Sauramoeba. 

As in all Plasmodium species, P. achiotense has both vertebrate and insect hosts. The vertebrate hosts for this parasite are reptiles.

Taxonomy 
The parasite was first described by Telford in 1972.

Description 
The gametocytes are round to ovoid in shape. They occupy a polar position in the erythrocytes which are enlarged and deformed.

Vectors
Not known.

References 

achiotense